Kader Bidimbou is a Congolese professional footballer, who plays as a forward for Hafia FC.

Bidimbou signed for Hafia on 1 June 2019.

International career
In January 2014, coach Claude Leroy, invited him to be a part of the Congo squad for the 2014 African Nations Championship. The team was eliminated in the group stages after losing to Ghana, drawing with Libya and defeating Ethiopia, the game in which Bidimbou made his full international debut.

International goals
Scores and results list Congo's goal tally first.

References

External links
 
 
 Kader Bidimbou at Footballdatabase

Living people
Republic of the Congo footballers
2014 African Nations Championship players
Republic of the Congo A' international footballers
1996 births
Place of birth missing (living people)
AC Léopards players
ACNFF players
A.D. Sanjoanense players
Olympique Club de Khouribga players
CSMD Diables Noirs players
CA Bordj Bou Arréridj players
Hafia FC players
Algerian Ligue Professionnelle 1 players
Botola players
Campeonato de Portugal (league) players
Association football forwards
Expatriate footballers in Portugal
Expatriate footballers in Morocco
Expatriate footballers in Algeria
Republic of the Congo international footballers
Republic of the Congo expatriate sportspeople in Morocco
Republic of the Congo expatriate sportspeople in Algeria
Republic of the Congo expatriate sportspeople in Guinea
Republic of the Congo expatriate sportspeople in Portugal
2018 African Nations Championship players
Expatriate footballers in Guinea
2022 African Nations Championship players